K. K. Premachandran was an Indian track and field athlete who specialized in the 400 meters event. He won a silver medal in the 400 meters event in the 1982 Asian Games and was hailed as the successor to Milkha Singh.

Career
Premachandran won the silver medal in the 400 metres event at the 1982 Asian games in New Delhi, having clocked 47.27 seconds in the final.

Death
Premachandran died on 16 April 2001, aged 46, following a massive heart attack in Kochi, Kerala.

References

Athletes from Palakkad
2001 deaths
Indian male sprinters
Year of birth missing
Asian Games medalists in athletics (track and field)
Athletes (track and field) at the 1982 Asian Games
Asian Games silver medalists for India
Medalists at the 1982 Asian Games